Boaedon capensis, the Cape house snake, also known as the brown house snake, is a species of lamprophiid from Botswana, South Africa (from KwaZulu-Natal all the way through to the Western Cape), Mozambique, Zambia and Zimbabwe. They are a non-venomous lamprophiid.
This species was previously grouped in the genus Lamprophis but is regrouped with the genus Boaedon.

Appearance 
Cape house snakes are usually dark brown on top, but the colour varies greatly from almost black through brown to olive green. The stripes that stretch from the rostral scale through the eye to the back of the head are very strong, thick, and bold. This species may have a lateral stripe running down the flanks, often resembling the links of a chain. They also sometimes have lateral stripes running along either side of the spine. Linking lines between the lateral striping is not uncommon. These body markings tend to be a paler brown/cream in colour on top of the often dark, chocolate-brown base tones. These markings normally fade two-thirds of the way down the body until only the base colour remains, but there are exceptions to the rule. Individuals without pattern are often found in the wild. These individuals have the head markings but no other markings on top of an often pale-brown body. Like all house snakes, Boaedon capensis is very iridescent, their scales often shining with an oily sheen in certain lights. This is a sexually dimorphic species. Males are smaller, often only reaching .

Behaviour and diet 
In the wild, this species is known to frequent human habitations, feeding on the rodents that gather there. It is a common misconception that South African people introduce these snakes to their home to eat rodents. This happens extremely rarely. Nocturnal by nature, this species is known to eat entire nests of mice in one sitting. In the wild, this species breeds once or twice per year.

In captivity 
This species is increasingly more common in the exotic pet trade, with many hobbyists beginning to keep and breed this species throughout the world. It has become increasingly popular with hobbyists as more reproducible morphs become available. Their care is basic, making them ideal for the new hobbyist, yet they still hold their interest for the more advanced keepers as well. In captivity, this species is known to breed as many as 6 times a year, laying 5–16 eggs every 60 days or so.

Morphs 
There are an increasingly high number of genetically reproducible colour variants available in the pet trade these days. Those that are known are listed below.

T+Albinos (Tyrosinase positive albinos), also known as caramel albinos, are very interesting-looking. Their body colour is a light, buttery yellow to a pale orange. Their eyes are green and their pupils are black. Their belly colour is mother-of-pearl, the same as it is for normals.

T-Albinos (Tyrosinase negative albinos) are very similar to the T+ in appearance. They are usually red in body colour with white body markings and a bright white belly. The eyes are green with red pupils.

Anerythristic Characterized by a grey/blue overtone, some mild yellow colour is not uncommon on the sides, similar to Anery corn snakes. The markings on the body are similar to that of the normals, pale cream/white in colour. The eyes are similar in colour to the overall body tone, with regular black pupils.

Calico This is an interesting mutation. It appears as though it does not present until the snake is around 1 year old. It presents with normal coloration for the first year, but then suddenly several scales will turn white. This gradually spreads as the snake sheds and grows, leaving the snake with large white patches of scales on it, somewhat similar to a piebald.

Erythristic Erythristic individuals present with heightened red pigment in the skin. This causes all other pigments to appear muted. These snakes have an overall red colour.

Hypomelanistic Hypomelanistic house snakes are similar in appearance to the T-Albinos, but slightly darker. There is visually more brown and dull red pigment. The eyes are green with primarily black pupils that in some lights have a slight red tinge.

Ilumo Ilumo is the name that has been coined for the green house snake morph. This morph heightens the green pigment in the skin, while the underbelly is a pale olive-yellow in colour. This appears to be a genetically patternless morph, with all individuals thus far having no pattern.

Patternless Patternless house snakes have the “V” markings on the head, mother-of-pearl belly tone, and brown overtones but none of the pattern on the body.

Striped Striped phase house snakes are very interesting indeed. They resemble striped house snakes, Boaedon lineatus greatly in their appearance. They are reportedly a locale-specific variant, occurring in the Springbok area of the Northern Cape. With the Springbok area being a semi-arid area of South Africa, some prefer to keep these snakes with lower humidity. This is perhaps not a morph of Cape house snake but a subspecies. However, since it hasn't been classified as such, it has been included here.

References

External links 
 
 House Snake Forums
 Informational, Boaedon Specialised Website & Forum. Boaedon.com

Lamprophiidae
Reptiles described in 1854
Reptiles of Botswana
Reptiles of Mozambique
Reptiles of South Africa
Reptiles of Zambia
Reptiles of Zimbabwe
Snakes of Africa
Taxa named by André Marie Constant Duméril
Taxa named by Gabriel Bibron